Novobayramgulovo (Yañı Bayramğol) is a rural locality (a village) and the administrative centre of Novobayramgulovsky Selsoviet, Uchalinsky District, Bashkortostan, Russia. The population was 444 as of 2010. There are 10 streets.

Geography 
Novobayramgulovo is located 47 km southwest of Uchaly (the district's administrative centre) by road. Kaipkulovo is the nearest rural locality.

References 

Rural localities in Uchalinsky District